United Nations Security Council Resolution 232, adopted on December 16, 1966, noted with concern that the efforts to break off international economic activity with Southern Rhodesia had failed to bring the rebellion to an end, the Council decided that all member states would prevent the importation of an asbestos, iron ore, chrome, pig-iron, sugar, tobacco, copper, or animal-products that had originated in Southern Rhodesia. Additionally, the activities of any of their nationals designed to promote the export of these commodities or the importation of arms, ammunition of all types, military aircraft, military vehicles and equipments and materials for the manufacture and maintenance of arms and ammunition along with a total embargo of oil and oil products, though exception was made for contracts granted before this resolution.

The Council also reaffirmed the inalienable rights of the people of Southern Rhodesia to freedom and independence and recognized the legitimacy of their struggle.

The resolution was adopted with 11 votes to none; the People's Republic of Bulgaria, France, Mali and the Soviet Union abstained.

See also
List of United Nations Security Council Resolutions 201 to 300 (1965–1971)
Unilateral Declaration of Independence (Rhodesia)
United Nations Security Council Resolution 221

References
Text of the Resolution at undocs.org

External links
 

 0232
 0232
United Nations Security Council sanctions regimes
Military history of Rhodesia
December 1966 events